Igor Vasilyevich Talankin (3 October 1927 – 24 July 2010) was a Soviet and Russian film director and screenwriter. His film Splendid Days (1960, co-directed with Georgiy Daneliya) won the Crystal Globe (the main award) at the Karlovy Vary International Film Festival, and Tchaikovsky (1969) was nominated for the Academy Award for Best Foreign Language Film.

Selected filmography
Splendid Days (1960)  
Introduction to Life (1962)
Day Stars (1968)
Tchaikovsky (1969)
Take Aim (1974)
Father Sergius (1978)
Starfall (1981)
Time for Rest from Saturday to Monday (1984)

References

External links

1927 births
2010 deaths
People from Noginsk
Academic staff of the Gerasimov Institute of Cinematography
People's Artists of the RSFSR
People's Artists of the USSR
Recipients of the Order "For Merit to the Fatherland", 4th class
Recipients of the Order of the Red Banner of Labour
Russian film directors
20th-century Russian screenwriters
Male screenwriters
20th-century Russian male writers
Soviet film directors
Soviet screenwriters